Aurora Pleșca ( Darko, born 2 September 1963 in Timișoara) is a Romanian rower.

References 
 
 

1963 births
Living people
Romanian female rowers
Sportspeople from Timișoara
Rowers at the 1984 Summer Olympics
Olympic silver medalists for Romania
Olympic medalists in rowing
Medalists at the 1984 Summer Olympics
World Rowing Championships medalists for Romania